Mía Maestro (born 19 June 1978) is an Argentine actress and singer. She is known for her roles as Nora Martinez in The Strain, Nadia Santos in the television drama Alias, as Christina Kahlo in Frida, as Carmen in The Twilight Saga, and as Marianela in For Love or Country: The Arturo Sandoval Story.

Early life and career
Maestro was born in Buenos Aires on 19 June 1978. She made her screen debut in Carlos Saura’s Tango, which received Golden Globe and Academy Award nominations for Best Foreign Film. Initially trained in Argentina, Maestro traveled to Berlin to develop a vocal repertoire of the works of Kurt Weill and Hanns Eisler. Her first proper acting turn was in the play The Summer Trilogy by Carlo Goldoni, and by 1998, she secured the coveted role of Lulu in Frank Wedekind’s Pandora's Box at the San Martin Theater in her hometown of Buenos Aires.  For this she garnered an "Ace" Award for Best New Artist of the Year.

In 2004, she joined the cast of ABC's critically acclaimed series Alias for two seasons. In the same year, Maestro also appeared in the Argentine film La Niña Santa (aka The Holy Girl), directed by Lucrecia Martel, as well as the Focus Features film The Motorcycle Diaries, (Golden Globe nominee in 2005 for Best Foreign Film) based on the journals of Che Guevara, leader of the Cuban Revolution. The film was directed by Walter Salles (Central Station), and stars Gael García Bernal and Rodrigo de la Serna. Maestro has starred as a victim of a kidnapping in Venezuela in Jonathan Jakubowicz’s thriller Secuestro Express, released by Miramax. In December 2005, she starred in Prince's music video for "Te Amo Corazón", which was directed by their mutual friend Salma Hayek.

In 2006, she co-starred in Wolfgang Petersen's film Poseidon, a remake of the 1972 film of the same name. She played Elena Gonzalaz, a stowaway girl going to meet her sick brother in the hospital with friend and waiter Valentine. Maestro starred in the off-Broadway musical play, My Life as a Fairytale, inspired by the life and works of author Hans Christian Andersen and singing the music of Stephin Merritt from The Magnetic Fields. She also starred in 1st Night, based on the opera Così fan tutte by Mozart, the comedy Meant to Be, and the American indie film The Music Never Stopped based on an Oliver Sacks story.

Maestro has been cast as the lead character in Cutthroat, an ABC television pilot for the 2010–2011 season. As of 30 September 2010, she has been cast as Carmen of the Denali Coven in The Twilight Saga: Breaking Dawn – Part 1 and Part 2. Maestro guest-starred in White Collar as Maya, a restaurant owner with whom Neal Caffrey (Matt Bomer) has a fling while on the run.

She played Dr. Nora Martinez in the vampire horror series The Strain, created by Guillermo del Toro. She also guest starred in the NBC television series Hannibal in 2015, playing the role of Allegra Pazzi, the wife of an Italian inspector. In 2017, she returned to theater and played the role of Diana Salazar in Ferdinand von Schirach's Terror. The play was produced in multiple countries, an adapted version of the play had its United States premiere in a production by Miami New Drama at Miami Beach's Colony Theatre.

In 2019, she starred as Sonia in the critically-acclaimed indie drama End of the Century. Her longtime friend Lucio Castro directed it and the film has been awarded various accolades in different film festivals. Continuing her success in independent film circuits, Maestro starred in the lead role of Magdalena in the magical realist film The Cow Who Sang a Song Into the Future (2022), directed by Francisca Alegria. The film premiered and competed for Grand Jury Prize at Sundance Film Festival and garnered rave reviews. In August 2022, it has been announced that Maestro is cast as the lead role opposite James Franco in the upcoming biopic Alina of Cuba, about Fidel Castro and his daughter Alina Fernández. Maestro is set to portray Natalia Revuelta Clews, Castro's lover and the mother of Alina. 

She currently lives in Los Angeles, California. Aside from her native Spanish, Maestro speaks English and Italian.

Musical career
As a singer-songwriter, Maestro has been performing in Los Angeles, New York City, and Buenos Aires, and is in preparation to start recording her EP followed by an album. In 2010, she performed in Iceland where she opened for Emiliana Torrini during several shows at the Háskólabíó theater in Reykjavík. She has collaborated with the UK band Faithless, singing on the song "Love is My Condition" on their album The Dance, released in May 2010.

Maestro's version of "Lloverá" appeared on the Twilight: Breaking Dawn – Part 1 soundtrack, also as part of an EP titled Blue Eyed Sailor, released in November 2012. The EP features three songs: "Blue Eyed Sailor", "Time to Go" (featuring Damien Rice) and "Lloverá". It also features a music video of "Blue Eyed Sailor", directed by Juan Azulay and Guillermo Navarro, inspired by the art of Cecilia Paredes.

On 7 October 2014, Mia Maestro's debut album Si Agua was released by Arts & Crafts. It was recorded in Iceland. NPR's Alt.Latino referred to her voice as one of Alt.Latino's favorites of 2014.

Awards
She won an ACE Award for her performance in the stage production of Pandora's Box. For her work in Alias, she won the Imagen Award for Best Supporting Actress in Television. In 2019, she has been awarded an honorable mention Grand Jury Award by Outfest for her performance in End of the Century, shared with her co-stars Juan Barberini and Ramon Pujol.

Filmography

Films

Television

Theater

References

External links

 
 
 

1978 births
Living people
Argentine female dancers
Argentine women singer-songwriters
Argentine film actresses
Argentine stage actresses
Argentine television actresses
Actresses from Buenos Aires
Argentine expatriates in Germany
Hispanic and Latino American actresses
20th-century Argentine actresses
21st-century Argentine actresses
20th-century Argentine women singers
21st-century Argentine women singers
21st-century American women